The Federation of Evangelical Churches in Italy (FCEI) is an ecumenical Protestant body in Italy.

History
The FCEI, formed in 1967, includes the historical Protestant churches of Italy, that is to say the Union of Methodist and Waldensian Churches (a united denomination comprising the Waldensian Evangelical Church and the Methodist Evangelical Church, 35,000 members), the Baptist Evangelical Christian Union of Italy (15,000), the Lutheran Evangelical Church in Italy (7,000), and other minor churches. The body includes also two observer members with a large following: the Federation of Pentecostal Churches (50,000 members) and the Italian Union of Seventh-day Adventist Christian Churches (25,000). The FCEI has a total membership of 140,000.

Presidents
Mario Sbaffi (Methodist, 1969–1973)
Aldo Comba (Waldensian, 1973–1976)
Piero Bensi (Baptist, 1976–1982)
Aurelio Sbaffi (Methodist, 1982–1988)
Giorgio Bouchard (Waldensian, 1988–1994)
Domenico Tomasetto (Baptist, 1994–2000)
Gianni Long (Waldensian, 2000–2006)
Domenico Maselli (Waldensian, 2006–2009)
Massimo Aquilante (Methodist, 2009–2015)
Luca Maria Negro (Baptist, 2015–2021)
Daniele Garrone (Waldensian, 2021–present)

See also
Religion in Italy
Christianity in Italy
Protestantism in Italy
List of Italian religious minority politicians

References

External links
Official website

Protestantism in Italy
Evangelicalism in Italy
.
Italy
Religious organisations based in Italy
Christian organizations established in 1967
1967 establishments in Italy